Kuhnke is a surname. Notable people with the name include:

Alice Bah Kuhnke (born 1971), Swedish Minister of Culture and Democracy 
Christian Kuhnke (born 1939), German tennis player
Günter Kuhnke (1912–1990), German Konteradmiral
Johannes Bah Kuhnke (born 1972), Swedish actor and singer
Kurt Kuhnke (1910–1969), German racing drivers
Wolf Kuhnke, President of the Ring deutscher Pfadfinderverbände

Surnames from given names